Novobaltachevo (Yañı Baltas) is a rural locality (a village) in Arlansky Selsoviet, Krasnokamsky District, Bashkortostan, Russia. The population was 30 as of 2010. There is 1 street.

Geography 
Novobaltachevo is located 25 km south of Nikolo-Beryozovka (the district's administrative centre) by road.

References 

Rural localities in Krasnokamsky District